Hedya is a genus of moths belonging to the subfamily Olethreutinae of the family Tortricidae.

Species

Hedya abjecta Falkovitsh, 1962
Hedya anaplecta (Meyrick, 1909)
Hedya atrifraga Diakonoff, 1968
Hedya auricristana (Walsingham, 1900)
Hedya caucasicana (Kennel, 1900)
Hedya chionosema (Zeller, 1875)
Hedya corni Oku, 1974
Hedya cyanana (Murtfeldt, 1880)
Hedya daeduchus Diakonoff, 1973
Hedya designata (Kuznetzov, 1970)
Hedya dimidiana (Clerck, 1759)
Hedya ebenina (Meyrick, 1916)
Hedya exsignata (Meyrick, 1916)
Hedya fibrata (Meyrick, 1909)
Hedya gratiana Kawabe, 1974
Hedya ignara Falkovitsh, 1962
Hedya inornata (Walsingham, 1900)
Hedya iophaea (Meyrick, 1912)
Hedya kurokoi Kawabe, 1995
Hedya leucalox Diakonoff, 1973
Hedya nubiferana (Haworth, [1811])
Hedya ochroleucana (Frolich, 1828)
Hedya perspicuana (Kennel, 1901)
Hedya pruniana (Hubner, [1796-1799])
Hedya salicella (Linnaeus, 1758)
Hedya semiassana (Kennel, 1901)
Hedya simulans Oku, 2005
Hedya sunmoonlakensis Kawabe, 1993
Hedya tsushimaensis Kawabe, 1978
Hedya vicinana (Ragonot, 1894)
Hedya walsinghami Oku, 1974
Hedya zoyphium Razowski & Wojtusiak, 2011

See also
List of Tortricidae genera

References

External links
tortricidae.com

Olethreutini
Tortricidae genera
Taxa named by Jacob Hübner